Vernon Sampson Nicholls (3 September 1917– 2 February 1996) was an Anglican clergyman who served in the Church of England as the Bishop of Sodor and Man from 1974 to 1983.

Birth and education
He was born in Truro on 3 September 1917   and educated at Truro School and  Durham University.

Church career
He studied for ordination at Clifton Theological College, was ordained in 1941, and held Curacies at Bedminster Down, Bristol, and at Liskeard in Cornwall. He was a temporary Chaplain to the Forces from 1944 to 1946. Later he was Vicar of Meopham then Rural Dean of Walsall.

From 1967 to 1974 he was Archdeacon of Birmingham when he was elevated to the Episcopate. From 1980 he was also Dean of the newly created Peel Cathedral — he was installed as such in the service where it was raised to cathedral status, on All Saints' Day (1 November 1980). He died on 2 February 1996 in Stratford-on-Avon.

Private life
Nicholls was a very active Freemason under the United Grand Lodge of England. Initiated in Philbrick Lodge No 2255 (Essex), most of his masonic memberships were in Warwickshire, where he rose in seniority, eventually becoming Provincial Grand Master of the county, and leader of its 181 lodges from 1985 to 1992, following his retirement from church life.

Notes

1917 births
1996 deaths
People from Truro
People educated at Truro School
Alumni of Durham University
World War II chaplains
Archdeacons of Birmingham
Church of England deans
Bishops of Sodor and Man
Royal Army Chaplains' Department officers
Deans of Peel
20th-century Church of England bishops